Andrian Bogdan (born 27 August 1976 in Chișinău) is a Moldovan football coach (goalkeepers coach) and former footballer.

Career
As footballer, he has played as goalkeeper for several clubs, including Romanian clubs Politehnica AEK Timișoara, Rapid București, and Moldovan side Constructorul Chișinău. He has played in a friendly match for Moldova national football team, on 12 February 2003, a 2:2 draw.

After withdrawing from football, Bogdan has continued to work in football as goalkeepers coach, and later as assistant manager. Between 2009 and 2012 he was Moldova's national team goalkeepers coach, under the rule of Gabi Balint. From 2008 until 2013 he was goalkeepers coach at FC Academia Chișinău (manager - Igor Dobrovolski). While at FC Academia, on 30 March 2013 Bogdan re-entered as player in an official match, against Olimpia Bălți, in a match of 24th round of 2012-13 Moldovan National Division, won by Academia 3–0; Bogdan succeeded to keep his goal intact and to withdraw definitively from football with a victory. On 9 April in the same year he left FC Academia.

From April until July 2013 he worked as goalkeepers coach for FC Vaslui, while manager was Gabi Balint. From July to December 2013 Bogdan was Ioan Andone's assistant manager at the Kazakhstani club FC Astana.

Andrian Bogdan was a candidate at the 2014 Moldovan parliamentary election on the lists of Party of „Patria”, led by Renato Usatîi, being on the 24th position in the list.

Honours

Player
Constructorul Chișinău
 Moldovan National Division (1): 1996–97
 Moldovan Cup (1): 1999-2000

References

External links
 
 
 
 
 

1976 births
Living people
Footballers from Chișinău
Moldovan footballers
Association football goalkeepers
Moldova international footballers
Moldovan expatriate footballers
Expatriate footballers in Romania
Moldovan expatriate sportspeople in Romania
Expatriate footballers in Ukraine
Moldovan expatriate sportspeople in Ukraine
Expatriate footballers in Kazakhstan
Moldovan expatriate sportspeople in Kazakhstan
Expatriate footballers in Belarus
Moldovan expatriate sportspeople in Belarus
FC Spumante Cricova players
FC Zimbru Chișinău players
FC Progresul București players
FC Politehnica Timișoara players
FC Rapid București players
FC Zorya Luhansk players
FC Granit Mikashevichi players
FC Academia Chișinău players
Moldovan Super Liga players
Ukrainian Premier League players
Moldovan football managers